The Soła is a river in southern Poland, a right tributary of the Vistula.

Soła originates in the Western Beskids mountain range near the border with Slovakia. It is made up of the confluence of several small creeks at the village of Rajcza. It runs downhill northeastwards through Żywiec Basin to the towns of Żywiec and Kęty, forming the border between the Silesian and the Żywiec Beskids. After , the Soła empties into the Vistula River after having passed the town of Oświęcim.

The river flows within metres of the Auschwitz concentration camp. The Auschwitz-Birkenau State Museum informs that the human ashes and ground bones of those murdered there were often dumped into the river.

Soła flows through or near the following settlements: Rajcza, Milówka, Cisiec, Węgierska Górka, Cięcina, Radziechowy, Wieprz, Żywiec, Tresna, Czernichów, Międzybrodzie Żywieckie, Międzybrodzie Bialskie, Porąbka, Czaniec, Kobiernice, Kęty, Nowa Wieś, Hecznarowice, Bielany, Łęki, and Oświęcim.

Notes and references

Rivers of Poland
Rivers of Silesian Voivodeship
Rivers of Lesser Poland Voivodeship